DFD may refer to:

 Dancing Ferret Discs, a record label
 Dartford railway station, Kent, England (National Rail code)
 Data flow diagram
 Demokratischer Frauenbund Deutschlands DDR (Democratic Women's League of Germany in the GDR)
 Dallas Fire Department
 Denver Fire Department
 Detroit Financial District
 Detroit Fire Department
 Direct Fusion Drive, a conceptual nuclear-fusion rocket engine 
 Document Freedom Day, promoting Open Standards
 Dog Fashion Disco, an American metal band
 Album by Dumbfoundead
 Dyfed, preserved county in Wales, Chapman code
 Köppen climate classification#Dfd/Dwd/Dsd: Subarctic or boreal climates with severe winters